Tehran is one of Iran's leading tourism destinations, and the city is home to an array of famous tourist attractions. In 2016, Tehran received 1.64 million foreign tourists. There are several artistic, historic and scientific museums in Tehran, including the National Museum of Iran, and the Carpet Museum. There is also the Museum of Contemporary Art, which hosts works of artists such as Andy Warhol, Pablo Picasso and Van Gogh.

The Iranian Imperial Crown Jewels, are also on display at Tehran's National Jewelry Museum. A number of cultural and trade exhibitions take place in Tehran and many of them are popular events for tourism. Tehran International Book Fair is known to the international publishing world as one of the most important publishing events in Asia. Also, There are many parks and open spaces in the Tehran area. Access to Tehran is provided by Imam Khomeini and Mehrabad airports. Also Tehran offers many forms of public transportation: Tehran Metro, a bus rapid transit system, trolleybuses, and a large network of highways with taxis.

Tourist attractions

Gallery

See also 

 Tourism in Iran
 List of tourist attractions in Tehran Province
 Hotels in Tehran
 List of museums in Tehran

References

External links 

 Tehran Guide at iranvisitor.com